Allah Deh may refer to:
 Allah Deh, Khaleh Sara (الله ده)